Haute-Sorne is a municipality in the district of Delémont in the canton of Jura in Switzerland.  On 1 January 2013 the former municipalities of Bassecourt, Courfaivre, Glovelier, Soulce and Undervelier merged to form the new municipality of Haute-Sorne.

History
Bassecourt is first mentioned in 1160 as Baressicort.  In 1184 it was first mentioned by its German name, Altdorf.  The hamlet of Berlincourt was first mentioned in 1303 as Burlincort.  Courfaivre is first mentioned in 1147 as Curfavro.  Glovelier is first mentioned in 1139 as Lolenviler.  Soulce is first mentioned in 1148 as Sulza.  The municipality was formerly known by its German name Sulz, however, that name is no longer used.  Undervelier is first mentioned in 1179 as Undreviller.  The municipality was formerly known by its unknown name Underswiler, however, that name is no longer used.

Geography

Of this area,  or 37.5% is used for agricultural purposes, while  or 49.9% is forested. The former municipality is located along the Sorne river in the Delemont valley. It lies at the intersection of the Delémont-La Chaux-de-Fonds and the Porrentruy-Biel/Bienne roads. It consists of the village of Bassecourt and the hamlet of Berlincourt.

Of this area,  or 51.0% is used for agricultural purposes, while  or 39.6% is forested. The former municipality is located on the Delémont-Glovelier road on the right bank of the Sorne river.

Of this area,  or 41.8% is used for agricultural purposes, while  or 46.8% is forested. The former municipality is located on the western end of the Delemont valley. The village lies at the intersection of the old road from Porrentruy to Biel and from Delemont to La Chaux-de-Fonds. It consists of the village of Glovelier and the hamlet of Sceut.

Of this area,  or 26.9% is used for agricultural purposes, while  or 70.7% is forested. The former municipality is located in a small valley east of Undervelier. The village grew up along a small stream in the valley.

Of this area,  or 24.2% is used for agricultural purposes, while  or 73.3% is forested. The former municipality is located between two of the Sorne river canyons and at the foot of Pichoux mountain.

Demographics

Historic Population
The historical population is given in the following chart:

Heritage sites of national significance
The Saint-Germain-d'Auxerre Church in Courfaivre, the Farm House at Au Village 17 and the prehistoric shelter at Le Mont in Glovelier is listed as a Swiss heritage site of national significance. The entire village of Soulce and the entire Les Forges area are designated as part of the Inventory of Swiss Heritage Sites.

Sights
Notable sights in the Undervelier area include the cave of Sainte-Colombe and the Gorges of Pichoux.  Other sights include the Vellerat Posé because of its greenery and the chapel Place Roland Béguelin built by Jeanne Bueche and André Bréchet's stained glass windows.

Transportation

References

Municipalities of the canton of Jura
Cultural property of national significance in the canton of Jura